Çërravë is an administrative unit in the municipality of Pogradec, Korçë County, Albania. The village of Çërravë is the seat of the eponymous unit and consist of the adjacent villages of Alarup, Blacë, Bletas, Grabovicë, Kodras, Leshnicë, Lumas, Nizhavec, Pretushë and Qershizë.

References 

Administrative units of Pogradec
Villages in Korçë County
Former municipalities in Korçë County